Fountain Creek is a tributary of the Arkansas River in Colorado, U.S.

Fountain Creek may also refer to:

Fountain Creek (Tennessee), a stream in Tennessee, U.S.
Fountain Creek, Illinois, an unincorporated community in Iroquois County, Illinois, U.S.
Fountain Creek Township, Iroquois County, Illinois, U.S.
Fountain Creek Bridge, a limestone arch bridge in Monroe County, Illinois, U.S.